Michele Piccirillo (born 29 January 1970 in Modugno, Italy) is a professional boxer in the welterweight division.

Amateur career

Michele Piccirillo was an Italian boxer who earned the nickname “Il Gentleman del Ring” for his elegant fighting style and sportsmanship. He started boxing under the guidance of his father and coach Scipione. As an amateur he fought 112 matches from 1986 to 1992, with 108 victories and 4 losses. The highlight of his amateur career came in 1991 when he won a bronze medal at the European Championship. He was eliminated in his first contest at the same year’s World Championship and also at the 1989 European Championships. Piccirillo turned professional after the Barcelona Games.

Professional career

In his 11th pro contest in 1994 he won the Intercontinental Light-Welterweight title against the Mexican Manuel Hernández, then on 21 July 1995, he became Italian champion against Franco Palmiero. His first defeat came in April 1996, in Denmark, where he lost a bout for the European title against the Dane Soren Sondergaard. After a final defense of the Italian title, he moved up to welterweight. On 29 November 1997, he knocked out the Briton Geoff McCreesh, to win the European welterweight crown.

Piccirillo immediately abandoned the title to challenge for the WBU world title, an organization with minimal recognition around the world. He won this title on 4 May 1998, at Catania in Sicily, against his fellow Italian Alessandro Duran. After 8 successful defences, he relinquished the title to fight for the more prestigious IBF title, which he then won in April 2002 by decision over the American Cory Spinks, the son of Leon Spinks which USA Today newspaper described as one of the most controversial decisions in modern boxing history. He lost the title the following year in a rematch.

After this Piccirillo moved up in weight again, this time to light-middleweights. On 13 August 2005, in Chicago, he was defeated by Ricardo Mayorga (Nicaragua) in a match for the latter’s WBC world crown. He rebounded to win the vacant European light-middleweight title against Lukáš Konečný, then defended it twice against Luca Messi and Michael Jones. On 1 December 2007, at Foxwoods Casino in Mashantucket, Connecticut, he tried again to win the world title, but was knocked out in round 11 by the American Vernon Forrest. His pro record ended at 50 wins (29 by KO), 5 losses (2 by KO), 1 no contest. Piccirillo was awarded the Gold Medal of the Italian Olympic Committee for his athletic achievements.

Professional boxing record

See also
List of world welterweight boxing champions

References

External links

 

|-

|-

1970 births
Living people
Italian male boxers
Sportspeople from the Metropolitan City of Bari
Boxers at the 1992 Summer Olympics
Olympic boxers of Italy
Light-welterweight boxers
Welterweight boxers
Light-middleweight boxers
World welterweight boxing champions
European Boxing Union champions
International Boxing Federation champions